The Underworld Story is a 1950 American film noir crime film directed by Cy Endfield and starring Dan Duryea, Herbert Marshall, Gale Storm, Howard Da Silva and Michael O'Shea. Da Silva plays the loud-mouthed gangster Carl Durham, one of his last roles before becoming blacklisted.

The newspaperman played by Duryea is similar in tone (a reporter that does anything for publicity for himself regardless of ethics) to Kirk Douglas in Billy Wilder's Ace in the Hole (1951).  This B-movie was shot in black and white by director Cy Endfield and cinematographer Stanley Cortez.

Plot
When big-city newspaper reporter Mike Reese (Duryea) writes and publishes a story (after breaking his promise to withhold it) that results in the murder of a state's witness against a local gang lord, he loses his job. He soon finds that no one else will hire him, so he extracts money from the drug lord (who is actually grateful for the story Reese published), moves to small-town Lakeville, and buys a half-interest in the newspaper, The Lakeville Sentinel. The newspaper is owned by Catherine Harris (Storm), who immediately has differences with Reese on how things should operate. Reese, trying to use the paper as a step up, latches onto a murder of a woman who happens to be the daughter-in-law of a newspaper magnate, his former employer. When a local black woman is suspected (revealed to the audience early as a scapegoat), Reese turns the story into a media circus, and soon his reporting is back in the spotlight again. Eventually, he finds himself having to decide if he will reform his opportunistic ways. The film is notable for the pejorative use of the word "nigger," though this is clearly dubbed, not what was originally filmed.

Cast
 Dan Duryea as Mike Reese
 Herbert Marshall as E.J. Stanton
 Gale Storm as Catherine Harris
 Howard Da Silva as Carl Durham
 Michael O'Shea as District Attorney Ralph Munsey
 Mary Anderson as Molly Rankin
 Gar Moore as Clark Stanton
 Melville Cooper as Maj. Redford
 Frieda Inescort as Mrs. Eldridge
 Art Baker as Lt. Tilton
 Harry Shannon as George "Parky" Parker
 Alan Hale Jr. as Shaeffer
 Stephen Dunne as Chuck Lee
 Roland Winters as Stanley Becker
 Sue England as Helen
 Lewis L. Russell as Calvin
 Frances Chaney as Grace
 Stanley Blystone as Policeman (uncredited) 
 Jack Mower as Diane Stewart's Father (uncredited) 
 Edward Van Sloan as Minister at Funeral (uncredited)

Production
The film was known as The Whip.

Reception

Critical response
The New York Times film critic, Bosley Crowther, panned the film. He wrote, "It is so poorly made, so haphazard and so full of detectable holes that it carries no impact or conviction, regardless of credibility. Mr. Chester and his associates are free to proclaim, if they wish, that newspaper men are no good. We think the same of his film."

Film historian and critic Glenn Erickson wrote about the film's theme, "The Underworld Story plays like the work of angry men. The title isn't very appropriate, as the story doesn't center on gangsters. Its main focus is the misuse of the power of the press, with side excursions into racism, class arrogance and the influence of organized crime. As in Billy Wilder's Ace in the Hole, raw greed leads to gross injustice. Like Wilder's venal Chuck Tatum, the reporter in The Underworld Story thinks of little beyond the next fast buck. 'Times are tough all over,' says a cynical official. 'Pretty soon a man won't be able to sell his own mother.'"

Comic book adaption
 Avon Periodicals: The Underworld Story (1950)

References

External links
 
 
 
 
 The Underworld Story information site and DVD review at DVD Beaver (includes images)

1950 films
1950 crime drama films
American crime drama films
American black-and-white films
Film noir
Films about journalists
Films directed by Cy Endfield
Films scored by David Rose
United Artists films
Films adapted into comics
Films based on works by Craig Rice
1950s English-language films
1950s American films